Wim Soutaer (born 27 June 1974) is a Belgian singer best known for placing third in Idool 2003, the Belgian version of Pop Idol.

Biography

Soutaer began singing in the early 1990s with his school band State Of Mind who performed benefit concerts of original songs and also covers of Pearl Jam, Nirvana and Metallica. When the guitarist left, they renamed themselves Bodhi and played at many festivals around Belgium, they also competed in many competitions including "Rockvonk" and placed third in "KumoRock".

In 2000, Soutaer wanted to sing solo and joined the project Soundmixshow a sort of precursor talent show to Idool, Soutaer placed fourth in competition overall, at this time he compared his style to Billy Joel, Mike Patton and Elton John.

In 2003, Soutaer entered the auditions for the contest Idool 2003 where he was told by jury member Jan Leyers that he has a good voice for Flemish music. After Soutaer placed third on the show he gained a recording contract with BMG Belgium and recorded his first CD Een Nieuw Begin (A New Start) which was produced by Ronald Vanhuffel who has had previous success with Blof and  Volumia, the first single was Allemaal (Everyone) which was a huge hit reaching #1, selling 40,000 copies and winning the Zomerhit 2003 Best Song Of The Year.

The second single from Een Nieuw Begin was Ik Hoor Bij Jou (I Belong With You). The third was Voor Altijd (For Always), based on the 1997 Nek hit Laura non c'e, and was another #1 hit on the Ultratop 50.

In August 2004, Soutaer released his second CD Twee (Two) and his first live DVD "In Miami". This was followed by his first tour "Twee" around Flanders, as well as a live performance on the popular live music show Tien Om Te Zien.

October 2005 brought a management change for Soutaer who signed with Niels William, assembling a team of writers including Hans Francken of Clouseau. He released a single Die Zomer Gaat Nooit Voorbij which was released on 17 June as a sample for his third CD released in October 2006. This was a cover of South African artist Kurt Darren's Hemel op Tafelberg in Afrikaans.

In 2001 he married Axelle Reuters, with whom he had a daughter in 2007.

Discography

Idool 2003 performances
Brussels Auditions: Honesty by Billy Joel
Theatre Round Day One: Better Man by Robbie Williams
Theatre Round Day Two: Uptown Girl by Billy Joel
Theatre Round Day Three: Faith by George Michael
Top 50: Honesty by Billy Joel
Top 10: Drops Of Jupiter (Tell Me) by Train
Top 9: With Or Without You by U2
Top 8: Afscheid by Marco Borsato
Top 7: Iris by Goo Goo Dolls
Top 6: I Heard It Through The Grapevine by Marvin Gaye
Top 5: Mack The Knife by Louis Armstrong
Top 4: Hero by Enrique Iglesias
Top 4: The Rhythm Divine by Enrique Iglesias
Top 3: Love Is All Around by Wet Wet Wet
Top 3: Blauw by The Scene

See also
Belgian music

External links
 Official website
 

1974 births
Living people
People from Halle, Belgium
Flemish musicians
Idols (franchise) participants
Dutch-language singers of Belgium
English-language singers from Belgium
Belgian pop singers
21st-century Belgian male singers
21st-century Belgian singers